Importin-7 is a protein that in humans is encoded by the IPO7 gene.

The importin-alpha/beta complex and the GTPase Ran mediate nuclear import of proteins with a classical nuclear localization signal. The protein encoded by this gene is a member of a class of approximately 20 potential Ran targets that share a sequence motif related to the Ran-binding site of importin-beta. Similar to importin-beta, this protein prevents the activation of Ran's GTPase by RanGAP1 and inhibits nucleotide exchange on RanGTP, and also binds directly to nuclear pore complexes where it competes for binding sites with importin-beta and transportin. This protein has a Ran-dependent transport cycle and it can cross the nuclear envelope rapidly and in both directions. At least four importin beta-like transport receptors, namely importin beta itself, transportin, RanBP5 and RanBP7, directly bind and import ribosomal proteins.

References

Further reading